Festuca duriuscula (syn. Festuca ovina L. var. duriuscula Macloskie) is a species of grass, which is an ornamental plant.

References
 

duriuscula
Plants described in 1753
Taxa named by Carl Linnaeus